

Regular season

Atlantic Region

Northern Region

Southern Region

Western Region

Playoffs

Southern Region
Carolina 1 :: 1 Wilmington (a.e.t.)
Wilmington 2 :: 0 Carolina
(Wilmington wins series 3-1 on aggregate)
Western Region
California 0 :: 1 Utah
Atlantic Region
Long Island (4) 0 :: PK :: 0 (5) New Jersey
Northern Region
New Hampshire 0 :: 3 Westchester
Westchester 2 :: 3 New Hampshire
(Westchester wins series 5-3 on aggregate)

League Semifinals
New Jersey (0) 3 :: PK :: 3 (3) Westchester
Wilmington 2 :: 1 Utah

USL-PSL Championship

3
2003